Mascoutah (YTB-772) was a United States Navy  named for Mascoutah, Illinois.

Construction

The contract for Mascoutah was awarded on 25 June 1963. She was laid down at Oyster Bay, Long Island, New York, by Jakobson Shipyard as Yard Number 420 and launched on 22 July 1964. Her sponsor was Mrs. E. D. Kimball.

Operational history
Mascoutah entered service in August 1964 and was initially assigned to duty in the 5th Naval District, Norfolk, Virginia. Reclassified YTM‑760 in September 1965, she served out of Norfolk until the summer of 1966 when she arrived in Philadelphia for duty in the 4th Naval District.

On 15 June 1986, Mascoutah was withdrawn from service and transferred to the Maritime Administration and placed in the National Defense Reserve Fleet, then transferred to the Saint Lawrence Seaway Development Corporation in 1989. In 1992 she was sold to Canadian owners as Eddie Mac I, and since 2001 has been operated by Atlantic Towing Ltd of Saint John, New Brunswick as Atlantic Aspen.

Notes

References

External links
 

Natick-class large harbor tugs
1964 ships
Ships built in Oyster Bay, New York